Edel & Starck is a German television series.

See also
List of German television series

References

External links
 

German comedy-drama television series
2002 German television series debuts
2005 German television series endings
Television shows set in Berlin
German-language television shows
Sat.1 original programming
German legal television series